Lena Söderblom (born 24 October 1935) is a Swedish actress. She has appeared in 24 films since 1955.

Selected filmography
 The Girl in the Rain (1955)
 Miss April (1958)
 Sängkammartjuven (1959)
Jönssonligan och Dynamit-Harry (1982)
 Sista dansen (1993)

References

External links

1935 births
Living people
Swedish film actresses
Actresses from Stockholm
20th-century Swedish actresses